Frank Hannah (born 15 February 1971 in Clydebank, Scotland) is a Scottish-born screenwriter and filmmaker.

Career
He wrote the film The Cooler with Wayne Kramer.  
Hannah wrote the script Damage specifically for former wrestler Steve Austin. 
Hannah wrote the script for the action movie Hunt to Kill, again with Steve Austin.

Awards
Hannah was nominated for a 2004 Golden Satellite Award and a 2004 Edgar Allan Poe Award (along with Wayne Kramer) for his screenplay to The Cooler.

Filmography

Feature Film
 Hunt to Kill (2011)
 Damage (2010)
 Homecoming (2008) (uncredited)
 The Cooler (2003)

Television
 Crash & Burn (2008)

References

External links

 Frank Hannah Film Shots Audio Interview
 Damage Official Site
 Frank's Official Website

1971 births
Living people
People from Clydebank
Scottish screenwriters